is a Japanese manga authored by Keiko Yamada, first published in 2004. The manga follows the life of a schoolgirl called Kakinomoto Karin, who loses the use of her legs following an accident, and subsequently falls in love with her attendant doctor, Okita Teppei.

Each chapter is called a 'Step'. As of chapter 13, Karin and Okita have been forced to give up on their hospital due to personal attacks by the board of a competing hospital.

The manga addresses the discrimination, low quality of life and lack of independence that people with disabilities experience.

Limited Lovers was originally picked up to be licensed for release in English, along the lines of Yamada's first two series, but was subsequently dropped.

See also
Keiko Yamada
Shōjo

2004 manga
Manga series
Shōjo manga
Romance anime and manga
Drama anime and manga